Edinburgh Western is a constituency of the Scottish Parliament (Holyrood) covering part of the council area of Edinburgh. It elects one Member of the Scottish Parliament (MSP) by the plurality (first past the post) method of election. It is one of nine constituencies in the Lothian electoral region, which elects seven additional members, in addition to the nine constituency MSPs, to produce a form of proportional representation for the region as a whole.

The constituency was created in 2011, when it replaced the former Edinburgh West constituency.

The seat has been held by Alex Cole-Hamilton of the Scottish Liberal Democrats since the 2016 Scottish Parliament election.

Electoral region

The other eight constituencies of the Lothian region are Almond Valley, Edinburgh Central, Edinburgh Eastern, Edinburgh Northern and Leith, Edinburgh Pentlands, Edinburgh Southern, Linlithgow and Midlothian North and Musselburgh.

The region includes all of the City of Edinburgh council area, parts of the East Lothian council area, parts of the Midlothian council area and all of the West Lothian council area.

Constituency boundaries and council area

The City of Edinburgh is represented in the Scottish Parliament by five constituencies: Edinburgh Central, Edinburgh Eastern, Edinburgh Northern and Leith, Edinburgh Pentlands, Edinburgh Southern and Edinburgh Western.

The Edinburgh West constituency was created at the same time as the Scottish Parliament, in 1999, with the name and boundaries of an  existing Westminster constituency. In 2005, however, Scottish Westminster (House of Commons) constituencies were mostly replaced with new constituencies.

For the 2011 Scottish Parliament election, Edinburgh West was redrawn and renamed "Edinburgh Western". The electoral wards used in this seat are:

In full: Almond, Drum Brae/Gyle
In part: Forth, Inverleith (shared with Edinburgh Northern and Leith), Corstorphine/Murrayfield (shared with Edinburgh Central)

Members of the Scottish Parliament

As Edinburgh Western

Election results

2020s

In 2021, Edinburgh Western set the record for the most votes ever cast for a single candidate in a Scottish Parliament election.

2010s

See also
 Politics of Edinburgh

References

External links

Constituencies of the Scottish Parliament
Constituencies in Edinburgh
2011 establishments in Scotland
Scottish Parliament constituencies and regions from 2011
Constituencies established in 2011
Corstorphine